The UK R&B Singles Chart is a weekly chart that ranks the 40 biggest-selling singles and albums that are classified in the R&B genre in the United Kingdom. The chart is compiled by the Official Charts Company, and is based on both physical, and digital sales.

The following are the songs which have topped the UK R&B Singles Chart in 2018.

Number-one singles

Notes
  - The single was simultaneously number one on the UK Singles Chart. 
  - The artist was simultaneously number one on the R&B Albums Chart.

See also

List of UK Singles Chart number ones of 2018
List of UK R&B Albums Chart number ones of 2018
List of UK Dance Singles Chart number ones of 2018

References

External links
R&B Singles Top 40 at the Official Charts Company
UK Top 40 RnB Singles at BBC Radio 1

2018 in British music
United Kingdom RandB Albums
2018